The Shinfa is a river of northwestern Ethiopia. It is an important tributary of the Atbarah River.

See also
List of rivers of Ethiopia

Notes

Atbarah River
Rivers of Ethiopia